Nermin or Nermine (نرمين) is a Persian feminine given name (in French also transcribed as Nermine). 
It means softness, delicate and it is used to describe kindness. The word Narm means soft in Persian, and “in” is a descriptive postfix. 
As Nermin, it is also given as a male name in Bosnia and Herzegovina. The masculine Bosnian name is again feminized as Nermina.

Notable people with the name include:

Nermin (feminine name)
 Nermin Bezmen, Turkish novelist
 Nermin Vlora Falaschi, Albanian intellectual
 Nermin Farukî (1904-1991), Turkish sculptor
 Nermin Al-Fiqy (b. 1972), Egyptian actress
 Nermin Gözükırmızı, Turkish professor
 Nermin Neftçi (1924-2003), Turkish lawyer, politician and former government minister
 Nermine Hammam (b. 1967), Egyptian artist
 Nermin Othman, Iraqi government minister
 Nermin Abadan Unat, Turkish academic

Nermin (masculine name)
 Nermin Bašić, Bosnian football manager
 Nermin Čeliković, Bosnian footballer
 Nermin Crnkić, Bosnian footballer
 Nermin Grbic, Canadian hairstylist
 Nermin Hadžiahmetović, Bosnian football manager
 Nermin Haskić, Bosnian footballer
 Nermin Ibrahimović, Serbian footballer
 Nermin Jamak, Bosnian footballer
 Nermin Karić, Bosnian-Swedish footballer
 Nermin Nikšić, Bosnian politician
 Nermin Purić, Bosnian politician
 Nermin Šabić, Bosnian footballer
 Nermin Useni, Serbian footballer
 Nermin Vazda, Bosnian footballer
 Nermin Zolotić, Bosnian footballer

Nermina
 Nermina Lukac, Swedish actress

Nermine
 Nermine Hammam, Egyptian artist

See also

Arabic feminine given names
Bosnian masculine given names
Bosniak masculine given names
Turkish feminine given names